The following is a list of notable deaths in January 2008.

Entries for each day are listed alphabetically by surname. A typical entry lists information in the following sequence:
 Name, age, country of citizenship at birth, subsequent country of citizenship (if applicable), reason for notability, cause of death (if known), and reference.

January 2008

1
Salvatore Bonanno, 75, American mobster, heart attack.
Peter Caffrey, 58, Irish actor, complications from stroke.
Pratap Chandra Chunder, 89, Indian Cabinet Minister (1977–1980), heart disease.
Harold Corsini, 88, American photographer, stroke.
Chuck Daniel, 74, American baseball player.
Harald Deilmann, 87, German architect and author.
Len Dockett, 87, Australian footballer.
Irena Górska-Damięcka, 97, Polish actress.
John Granville, 33, American diplomat, homicide.
Philip Hogarty, 19, Irish Chess Union president, car accident.
Erich Kästner, 107, German jurist and last known World War I veteran.
T. Maheswaran, 47, Sri Lankan politician, Cabinet Minister, assassination by gunshot.
Lucas Sang, 46, Kenyan runner and 1988 Olympian, homicide.
Wanda Sieradzka de Ruig, 84, Polish author, poet, journalist and translator. 
Oleg Tolmachev, 88, Russian ice hockey player and coach.

2
Henri Andrieux, 76, French Olympic cyclist.
Joyce Carlson, 84, American artist, designer of Disney's It's a Small World rides, cancer.
Lee S. Dreyfus, 81, American politician, Governor of Wisconsin (1979–1983).
George MacDonald Fraser, 82, British novelist and non-fiction writer (Flashman series), cancer. 
Brice Mack, 90, American background painter and animator (Cinderella, Peter Pan, Fantasia).
Ben Marlin, 31, American bassist (Disgorge), cancer.
Keith McCance, 78, Australian politician, member of the Victorian Legislative Assembly (1979–1989).
G. G. Njuguna Ngengi, Kenyan politician, homicide.
Julio Martínez Pradanos, 84, Chilean sports journalist, cancer.
Robert C. Schnitzer, 101, American actor, producer and educator.
Günter Schubert, 69, German actor.
Gerry Staley, 87, American baseball pitcher (Chicago White Sox), natural causes.
Galyani Vadhana, 84, Thai princess, eldest sister of King Bhumibol Adulyadej, cancer.
Edward F. Welch, Jr., 83, American admiral, heart failure.

3
Aleksandr Abdulov, 54, Russian actor, lung cancer.
Jack Aranson, 83, British actor, pneumonia.
Edelmiro Arévalo, 78, Paraguayan football player.
Yo-Sam Choi, 35, South Korean boxer, WBC Light Flyweight Champion, cerebral hemorrhage.
Henri Chopin, 85, French poet and artist.
Natasha Collins, 31, British television presenter. 
Werner Dollinger, 89, German politician.
Petru Dugulescu, 62, Romanian Baptist pastor, poet and politician, heart attack.
Milt Dunnell, 102, Canadian sportswriter.
Butch Felker, 62, American mayor of Topeka, Kansas, cancer.
Gilbert A Harrison, 92, American magazine editor.
Joseph Lazarow, 84, American mayor of Atlantic City, New Jersey.
Herman Le Compte, 78, Belgian doctor, the 'Vitamin Doctor', heart attack.
Mary Marques, 111, American supercentenarian, Massachusetts' oldest person.
Antônio Matias, 44, Portuguese judoka.
Andrew J. Olmsted, 37, American army blogger in Iraq, shot.
Lisandro Otero, 75, Cuban author.
Nikolay Puzanov, 69, Russian Soviet biathlete, 1968 Olympic Gold medalist.
Manolo Reyes, 83, American pioneering Spanish-language newscaster, Parkinson's disease.
Jimmy Stewart, 76, British racing driver.
O.G. Style, 37, American rapper, brain aneurysm.

4
Vyacheslav Ambartsumyan, 67, Russian footballer, hit by car.
Bjørn Odmar Andersen, 64, Norwegian footballer.
Sir Bernard Audley, 83, British businessman and philanthropist.
Keith Baxter, 36, British drummer of rock band 3 Colours Red, liver failure.
Xavier Chamorro Cardenal, 75, Nicaraguan editor of El Nuevo Diario, heart failure.
Stig Claesson, 79, Swedish writer.
Vernon Derrick, 74, American musician.
Emilio Benavent Escuín, 93, Spanish Bishop of Granada.
Mort Garson, 83, Canadian electronic musician, renal failure.
Herbert Keppler, 82, American photojournalist.
Marianne Kiefer, 79, German actress. 
Jimmy Nah, 39, Singaporean comedian.
John O'Donohue, 52, Irish poet, philosopher and priest.
Graham Percy, 69, British illustrator of children's books.
Jens Quistgaard, 88, Danish industrial designer for Dansk International Designs.
Bill Ramsey, 87, American baseball player.
Henry Savory, 93, British cricketer.
Bert Walker, 88, New Zealand politician, Cabinet Minister.
Claude Whatham, 80, British film and television director.

5
Luis E. Aguilar Leon, 81, Cuban journalist, professor and historian.
Tony Ambrose, 74, British rally driver.
John Ashley, 77, Canadian referee in the National Hockey League, heart failure.
Rowan Ayers, 85, British television producer.
Michel Conte, 75, French born, naturalized Canadian choreographer, lyricist and composer of film music and television music.
Giovanni Rinaldo Coronas, 89, Italian politician, police chief and Interior Minister.
Phillip S. Figa, 56, American federal judge, brain tumor.
Raymond Forni, 66, French politician, National Assembly president, leukemia.
Thomas Cecil Gray, 94, British pioneer in anaesthetics.
Clinton Grybas, 32, Australian sports commentator, epidural hematoma.
Louis Hon, 83, French footballer.
Edward Kłosiński, 65, Polish cinematographer.
Ronald Lee Moore, 40, American fugitive and suspected serial killer, suicide by hanging.
Luiz Pacheco, 82, Portuguese writer.
Irene Reid, 77, American jazz singer, cardiac arrest
İhsan Saraçlar, 79, Turkish jurist and politician.

6
Shmuel Berenbaum, 87, American Orthodox rabbi and rosh yeshiva, stomach cancer.
Jack Brod, 98, American last original tenant of the Empire State Building.
Arafan Camara, 60, Guinean politician.
Bob LeMond, 94, American radio and television announcer (Leave It to Beaver).
Cy Leslie, 85, American founder of Pickwick Records and MGM/UA Home Entertainment Group.
Alekos Michaelides, 74, Cypriot politician, Foreign Minister.
Yunus Mohamed, 57, South African lawyer and anti-Apartheid activist.
Ken Nelson, 96, American record producer and member of the Country Music Hall of Fame.
Anders Paulrud, 56, Swedish writer and journalist, lung cancer.
Regal Discovery, 15, Canadian Thoroughbred racehorse.
Pramod Karan Sethi, 80, Indian orthopaedic surgeon, inventor of the Jaipur foot, cardiac arrest.
Charlie Steele Jr., 77, New Zealand football player.
Vittorio Tomassetti, 77, Italian Bishop of Fano-Fossombrone-Cagli-Pergola.

7
Philip Agee, 72, American CIA agent, complications from perforated ulcer surgery.
Raffaello de Banfield, 85, British composer.
Robert Chandran, 57, Singaporean CEO of Chemoil, helicopter crash.
Maryvonne Dupureur, 70, French runner and 1964 Olympic medalist.
Houston I. Flournoy, 78, American member of California State Assembly (1961–1967), California State Controller (1967–1975).
Detlef Kraus, 88, German pianist.
Andrey Kurennoy, 35, Russian track and field athlete, national triple jump champion.
Buddy LeRoux, 77, American owner of the Boston Red Sox, natural causes.
Boris Lurie, 83, American artist and writer.
Vincent Meli, 87, American member of the Detroit Partnership, bone cancer.
Bozo Miller, 89, American competitive eater, natural causes.
Hans Monderman, 62, Dutch traffic engineer, cancer.
Marcel Mouly, 88, French painter.
*Njoo Kiem Bie, 81, Indonesian badminton player.
Palace Music, 26, American Thoroughbred racehorse, euthanized.
Alwyn Schlebusch, 90, South African politician, Vice State President (1981–1984).
Jean-Claude Vrinat, 71, French owner of Taillevent restaurant, lung cancer.
Wei Wenhua, 41, Chinese blogger, beaten.

8
D. M. Dassanayake, 54, Sri Lankan Minister of Nation Building, roadside bomb.
Jim Dooley, 77, American football player and coach (Chicago Bears), amyotrophic lateral sclerosis.
David Grove, 57, New Zealand developer of Clean Language.
Guy Hance, 74, Belgian politician.
Bjarni Jónsson, 73, Icelandic painter.
Moshe Levi, 71, Israeli Chief of Staff of the Defense Forces (1983–1987), stroke.
George Moore, 84, Australian jockey and trainer.
Clyde Otis, 83, American songwriter and record producer.
Irvan Perez, 85, American Isleño décima singer and woodcarver, heart attack.
Steve Ridzik, 78, American baseball player (Philadelphia Phillies), heart disease.
Mohammad Sadli, 85, Indonesian politician.
Shaadi, 21, American-bred, British-trained Thoroughbred racehorse and sire.
Cissie Stewart, 96, British Olympic swimmer.
Xu Genjun, 72, Chinese biochemist, member of the Chinese Academy of Sciences.

9
Paul Aimson, 64, English footballer (Manchester City, York City), heart attack.
Jorge Anaya, 81, Argentinian admiral, heart failure.
Bobby Beasley, 72, Irish jockey and racehorse trainer.
Sir Adam Butler, 76, British MP (1970–1987) and minister.
Václav Čevona, 85, Czech Olympic athlete.
Carmine Furletti, 81, Brazilian industrialist, president of Cruzeiro.
Gemina, 21, American-born African Baringo giraffe at the Santa Barbara Zoo with neck deformity, euthanized.
Mehran Ghassemi, 30, Iranian journalist, heart failure.
Johnny Grant, 84, American entertainer, honorary Mayor of Hollywood.
Sir John Harvey-Jones, 83, British businessman and media personality.
Walter J. Kavanaugh, 74, American politician, complications from diabetes.
Roi Kwabena, 51, Trinidadian cultural anthropologist, lung cancer.
Sara Misquez, 62, American president of the Mescalero Apache of New Mexico (1999–2003), car accident.
Peter O'Donnell, 68, Australian gold medal-winning Olympic sailor (1964), cancer.
Erna Sondheim, 103, German fencer.
Lew Spence, 87, American songwriter.
Sir John Willis, 70, British Air Chief Marshal.
Tim Willoughby, 53, Australian 1984 Olympic rowing medallist, heart attack.

10
Pandiyan, 49, Tamil Actor and Politician (Times of India), liver failure due to jaundice.
Rod Allen, 63, British singer and bassist (The Fortunes), liver cancer.
Christopher Bowman, 40, American Olympic figure skater, accidental drug overdose.
Jack Eagle, 81, American comedian and actor (Stepmom, Isn't She Great).
Ray M. Flavin, 95, American politician.
Abdelaziz Gorgi, 79, Tunisian painter.
Andrés Henestrosa, 101, Mexican writer and politician, proponent of the Zapotec language.
George Laking, 95, New Zealand diplomat and public servant.
Andrée Marlière, 73, Belgian prima ballerina, choreographer and painter, cancer.
Allan McEachern, 81, Canadian jurist, Chief Justice of the Supreme Court of British Columbia. 
Mikhail Minin, 85, Russian soldier who raised the Soviet flag on the Reichstag building in 1945.
Sir Geoffrey Musson, 97, British army general.
Katsutoshi Nagasawa, 84, Japanese composer.
Freddy Nieuland, 63, Belgian drummer and vocalist for (Wallace Collection), cancer
Maila Nurmi, 85, Finnish actress (Plan 9 from Outer Space, The Beat Generation).
Zhang Lichang, 68, Chinese politician, Politbureau member.

11
Mohammad Alam, 61, Bangladeshi photo journalist.
José Bello, 103, Spanish intellectual and writer. 
Pete Candoli, 84, American big band-era jazz trumpeter, prostate cancer.
Murray Cohl, 78, Canadian film producer, co-founder of the Toronto Film Festival and Canada's Walk of Fame, liver cancer.
Sir Edmund Hillary, 88, New Zealand mountaineer and the first person (with Tenzing Norgay) to reach summit of Mount Everest, heart failure.
Carl Karcher, 90, American founder of Carl's Jr. restaurants, complications from Parkinson's disease.
Frank Loughran, 77, Australian international footballer.
Nancy Phelan, 94, Australian writer.

12
Charlie Aitken, 75, Scottish footballer.
Gennady Bachinsky, 36, Russian television and radio personality, car accident.
Isobel Bennett, 98, Australian marine scientist.
Gwendolyn T. Britt, 66, American Maryland State Senator since 2003.
Sir Howard Dalton, 63, British microbiologist, Chief Scientific Adviser at DEFRA.
Adriano González León, 76, Venezuelan writer.
Ángel González Muñiz, 82, Spanish poet.
Marty Hendin, 59, American vice president of community relations for St. Louis Cardinals, cancer.
Leszek Jezierski, 79, Polish footballer and trainer. 
Anatoly Kyarov, Russian head of the Kabardino-Balkaria police, shot.
Jennifer Musa, 90, Irish-born Pakistani politician.
Louis Alexandre Raimon, 85, French hairdresser.
Stanisław Wycech, 105, Polish last World War I veteran.

13
Joe Burk, 93, American rowing champion, complications of surgery.
John Harvey, 87, British politician, MP for Walthamstow East (1955–1966).
Sergej Larin, 51, Lithuanian tenor.
Johnny Podres, 75, American baseball pitcher (Brooklyn Dodgers), 1955 World Series MVP.
Jafar Shahidi, 89, Iranian linguist and historian.
Doreen Tovey, 89, British writer.
Patricia Verdugo, 61, Chilean writer, journalist and human rights violations investigator, cancer.
Walter Zimper, 65, Austrian politician.

14
Józef Bartosik, 90, Polish World War II veteran and rear admiral.
Don Cardwell, 72, American baseball pitcher.
Kaj Christiansen, 86, Danish association football player.
Selim Al Deen, 58, Bangladeshi dramatist, cardiac arrest.
Judah Folkman, 74, American cancer researcher, apparent heart attack.
Thor Hesla, 45, American USAid worker in the 2008 Kabul Serena Hotel attack.
Richard Knerr, 82, American co-founder of Wham-O, inventor of the frisbee and Hula Hoop, stroke.
Vincenz Liechtenstein, 57, Austrian politician.
Tommy Limby, 60, Swedish cross-country skier.
Joseph Payne, 70, British musician.
Johnny Steele, 91, British football manager of Barnsley (1960–1971, 1972–1973).
Carsten Thomassen, 38, Norwegian journalist, 2008 Kabul Serena Hotel attack.
Milton Wolff, 92, American Spanish Civil War veteran.
Wu Jin, 74, Taiwanese Minister for Education (1996–1998), cancer.

15
K. M. Adimoolam, 69, Indian abstract artist.
Rupe Andrews, 81, Canadian football player.
Roger Anger, 84, French architect.
Arthur I. Appleton, 92, American businessman.
Mark Haigh-Hutchinson, 43, British video game developer (Paperboy, Zombies Ate My Neighbors), pancreatic cancer.
Eduardo Hontiveros, 84, Filipino Jesuit composer of Roman Catholic liturgical songs, stroke.
John D. Lawson, 84, British scientist.
Adele Longmire, 89, American actress.
Jason MacIntyre, 34, British road bicycle racer, road accident.
Ronald Noll, 78, American conductor, complications from diabetes and heart disease.
Brad Renfro, 25, American actor (The Client, Ghost World, The Jacket), accidental heroin overdose.
Anthony M. Solomon, 88, American President of Federal Reserve Bank of New York (1980–1985), kidney failure.

16
Jorge de Bagration, 63, Spanish race car driver, claimant to throne of the Royal House of Georgia, hepatitis.
*Chen Xilu, 79, Chinese Roman Catholic Bishop of Hengshui, organ failure.
Nikola Kljusev, 80, Macedonian politician and economist, Prime Minister of Macedonia (1991–1992).
Pierre Lambert, 87, French Trotskyist leader and 1988 presidential candidate.
Munjuku Nguvauva II, 85, Namibian traditional tribal chief, complications from strokes.
Gerry Tordoff, 78, English cricketer (Somerset).
Hone Tuwhare, 85, New Zealand Māori poet.
Bungo Yoshida, 73, Japanese Bunraku puppeteer, liver cancer.
Elias Zoghby, 96, Egyptian Melkite Greek Catholic Archbishop of Baalbek.

17
Manfred Abelein, 77, German politician.
Mofida Ahmed, 88, Indian politician.
Carlos, 64, French singer, cancer.
Joseph M. Champlin, 77, American Roman Catholic priest, bone marrow, cancer.
Trevor Drayton, 52, Australian winemaker, explosion.
Tony Dean, 75, British racing driver.
Bobby Fischer, 64, American chess grandmaster, world champion (1972–1975), kidney failure.
Edward D. Hoch, 77, American writer of detective fiction, heart attack.
Ernie Holmes, 59, American football player (Pittsburgh Steelers), car accident.
Alejandro Illescas, 48, Mexican voice actor. 
Mildred Callahan Jones, 64, American decorative flag pioneer.
Denise Amber Lee, 21, American kidnap victim, shot.
Carole Lynne, 89, British actress, wife of Bernard Delfont.
John McHale, 86, American baseball player.
Allan Melvin, 84, American actor (The Phil Silvers Show, The Brady Bunch, All in the Family), cancer.
Madeleine Milhaud, 105, French actress, wife of Darius Milhaud.
Giuliana Penzi, 90, Italian dancer and choreographer.
Della Purves, 62, British botanical artist, liver disease.
William E. Schaufele Jr., 84, American diplomat, U. S. Ambassador to Upper Volta (1969–1971), U. S. Ambassador to Poland (1978–1980).
Trevor Sprigg, 61, Australian politician, Western Australian Legislative Assembly whip, heart attack.
Jinzo Toriumi, 78, Japanese novelist and screenwriter (Speed Racer, Gatchaman, Armored Trooper Votoms), liver cancer.
Eddy Williams, 92, Australian cricketer.

18
Uzi Cohen, 55, Israeli Likud politician, heart attack. 
Pier Miranda Ferraro, 83, Italian opera tenor, cardiac arrest.
Wally Fielding, 88, British footballer (Everton).
Georgia Frontiere, 80, American majority-owner of Los Angeles/St. Louis Rams, breast cancer.
Ruth Hamilton, 109, American talk show host, member of New Hampshire General Court (1964–1966, 1973–1975).
Bertram "Jimmy" James, 92, British World War II airman, participant in The Great Escape.
Frank Lewin, 82, American composer, heart failure.
Sir Frederick Mason, 94, British diplomat, Ambassador to Chile.
Lois Nettleton, 80, American actress (A Face in the Crowd), lung cancer.
Paul Nixon, 93, American Olympic cyclist.
Ugo Pirro, 87, Italian screenwriter.
John Stroger, 78, American politician, President of the Cook County, Illinois Board, stroke.

19
Sir Derek Alun-Jones, 74, British businessman.
Valentim Amões, 48, Angolan politician and businessman, air crash.
Georgina Bruni, 61, British UFO researcher and author, cancer.
Creighton Burns, 82, Australian editor (The Age, 1981–1989), cancer.
Victor S. Johnson, Jr., 91, American lawyer, president of Aladdin Industries, colon cancer.
Frances Lewine, 86, American journalist and White House Correspondent, stroke. 
Morris Maddocks, 79, British Bishop of Selby (1972–1983).
Mildred Noble, 86, American writer and Native American activist, complications from liver cancer.
Andy Palacio, 47, Belizean musician, UNESCO Artist for Peace and Garifuna activist, heart attack followed by stroke.
Lou Palmer, 75, American radio personality and announcer, brain hemorrhage.
Suzanne Pleshette, 70, American actress (The Bob Newhart Show, The Birds, Spirited Away), respiratory failure.
Eugene Sawyer, 73, American politician, Mayor of Chicago (1987–1989), strokes.
John Stewart, 68, American musician (The Kingston Trio), stroke.
Trevor Taylor, 50, Jamaican-born German singer (Bad Boys Blue), heart attack.
H. Bradford Westerfield, 79, American political scientist, complications of Parkinson's disease.
Don Wittman, 71, Canadian sports broadcaster for CBC, cancer.

20
Clark Allen, 82,  American entertainer, artist, and businessman, respiratory failure.
Louis de Cazenave, 110, French supercentenarian, second-to-last official surviving French World War I veteran, natural causes.
Ken Gee, 92, Australian judge.
Harry Gill, 85, British Royal Air Force officer.
Talivaldis Kenins, 88, Canadian composer.
Margit Kristian, 94, Yugoslavian Olympic fencer.
Abdul Latif, 56, British restaurateur, heart attack.
Duilio Loi, 78, Italian boxer, Alzheimer's disease.
Tommy McQuater, 93, British jazz trumpeter.
Donald Odanga, Kenyan basketball player, accidental shooting.
Ghorban Soleimani, 87, Iranian vocalist and dotar player.
James LeVoy Sorenson, 86, American medical device inventor and billionaire philanthropist, cancer.
Georges Wahler, 74, French Olympic shooter.
Eudoxia Woodward, 88, American painter, cancer.

21
Rooster Andrews, 84, American football player.
Pam Barrett, 54, Canadian politician, cancer.
Billy Elliott, 82, British footballer (Sunderland).
Evan G. Galbraith, 79, American diplomat, Ambassador to France (1981–1985), cancer.
Burton Hatlen, 71, American literary scholar, founder of National Poetry Foundation, mentor to Stephen King, pneumonia.
Peggy Jay, 95, British politician.
Wesley Ngetich Kimutai, 30, Kenyan marathon runner, homicide by poison arrow.
Kenneth Parnell, 76, American convicted child molester and kidnapper, natural causes.
Jiří Sequens, 85, Czech film director.
Marie Smith Jones, 89, American last known native speaker of the Eyak language, natural causes.
Luiz Carlos Tourinho, 43, Brazilian actor, cerebral aneurysm.

22
Orhan Aksoy, 78, Turkish director and screenwriter.
Bernie Boston, 74, American photographer ("flower power" movement), blood disease.
Dora Bria, 49, Brazilian windsurfing champion, car accident.
Mike Cacic, 71, Canadian footballer (British Columbia Lions).
Diane Chenery-Wickens, 48, British television make-up artist, murder (last seen alive on this date).
Lance Clemons, 60, American baseball relief pitcher, cancer.
Roberto Gari, 88, American actor and artist, heart attack.
Helge Hansen, 82, Danish Olympic cyclist.
Heath Ledger, 28, Australian actor (The Dark Knight, Brokeback Mountain, 10 Things I Hate About You), Oscar winner (2009), accidental drug overdose.
Miles Lerman, 88, American founder of the United States Holocaust Memorial Museum.
Ştefan Niculescu, 80, Romanian composer.
Claude Piron, 76, Swiss linguist and Esperanto author.
Kevin Stoney, 87, British actor (Doctor Who), skin cancer.

23
Andrzej Andrzejewski, 46, Polish Brigadier General of the Polish Air Force, air crash.
David Askevold, 67, Canadian artist.
Felix Carlebach, 96, British rabbi.
Steve Duplantis, 35, American pro golf caddy, car accident.
Leticia de Oyuela, 74, Honduran historian. 
Stein Rønning, 42, Norwegian karate world champion (1990).

24
Lee Embree, 92, American photographer, took first air-to-air photographs of 1941 attack on Pearl Harbor, kidney infection.
Art Frantz, 86, American baseball umpire, heart failure.
Johannes Heggland, 88, Norwegian author and politician.
Dorothy Hennessey, 94, American nun and activist.
J. Robert Hooper, 71, American politician, Maryland State Senator (1999–2007), colon cancer.
*Megat Junid, 65, Malaysian MP, Minister of Domestic Trade and Consumer Affairs (1997–1999) prostate cancer.
Randy Salerno, 45, American news reporter (CBS, WBBM-TV), snowmobile accident.
Jahna Steele, 49, American transgender showgirl.

25
Christopher Allport, 60, American actor (Felicity, Dynasty), avalanche.
Evelyn Barbirolli, 97, British oboist, wife of Sir John Barbirolli.
Annette Cameron, 88, Australian political activist.
Richard Darman, 64, American Director of the Office of Management and Budget (1989–1993), leukemia.
Ralph Dupas, 72, American boxer, complications of boxing-induced brain damage. 
Louisa Horton Hill, 87, American actress (All My Sons).
Andreas Hönisch, 77, Polish Superior General of Servi Jesu et Mariae, founder of the Catholic Scouts of Europe.
Roc Kirby, 89, Australian founder of Village Roadshow Limited.
Robert Miller, 24, American soldier, posthumous Medal of Honor recipient, killed in action.
Cândido Rubens Padín, 92, Brazilian Bishop of Bauru.
Aziz Sedki, 87, Egyptian Prime Minister (1972–1973).
P. K. Thomas, 81, Welsh neurologist.
Gary Wiggins, 55, Australian cyclist.

26
John Ardagh, 79, British journalist and author.
Christian Brando, 49, American actor and convicted killer, son of Marlon Brando, pneumonia.
Abraham Brumberg, 81, American writer and editor, heart failure.
Raymond Daniels, 28, Irish footballer (Wicklow GAA), suspected heart attack.
Igor Dmitriev, 80, Russian actor.
George Habash, 81, Palestinian founder of the Popular Front for the Liberation of Palestine, heart attack.
Bryan Jennett, 81, British neurosurgeon.
Arthur Kramer, 81, American lawyer, founder of Kramer Levin, brother of playwright Larry Kramer, stroke.
Padraic McGuinness, 69, Australian journalist and editor, cancer.
Jeff Salen, 55, American guitarist, founder of punk band Tuff Darts, heart attack.
Viktor Schreckengost, 101, American artist and industrial designer.
Robert Weaver, 87, Canadian editor and broadcaster.
Lovie Yancey, 96, American founder of Fatburger restaurant chain, pneumonia.
Zhang Hanzhi, 72, Chinese diplomat and linguist, English tutor for Mao, Nixon interpreter for 1972 visit, lung-related illness.

27
Botho Prinz zu Sayn-Wittgenstein-Hohenstein, 80, German politician, president of German Red Cross (1982–1994).
Gordon B. Hinckley, 97, American President of the Church of Jesus Christ of Latter-day Saints.
Mike Holovak, 88, American football player and coach (Boston Patriots), pneumonia.
Ken Hunt, 69, American baseball player (Cincinnati Reds).
John W. Ingram, 79, American railroad executive (Chicago, Rock Island and Pacific Railroad).
Anna Loginova, 29, Russian bodyguard for boxer Kostya Tszyu, head injury during carjacking.
Gerry McIntyre, 78, Irish Olympic athlete.
Alan G. Rogers, 40, American Army major, first known gay combat fatality of Iraq War, improvised explosive device.
Valery Shumakov, 76, Russian transplantologist, founder of the Transplant and Artificial Organs Research Institute.
Irene Stegun, 88, American mathematician. 
Suharto, 86, Indonesian President (1967–1998), multiple organ dysfunction syndrome.
Louie Welch, 89, American mayor of Houston, Texas (1964–1973), lung cancer.

28
Crisologo Abines, 60, Filipino politician, heart attack.
Les Anning, 94, Canadian ice hockey player.
Christodoulos, 69, Greek primate of the Church of Greece, cancer.
Frances Dewey Wormser, 104, American vaudeville and Broadway theater actress.
Dagfinn Grønoset, 87, Norwegian author.
John Gunnell, 74, British politician, MP (1992–2001).
Tapio Hämäläinen, 85, Finnish actor and theater counsellor.
Gerry Patrick Hemming, 70, American anti-Castro mercenary.
Bengt Lindström, 82, Swedish painter. 
Larry Smith, 68, American college football coach, chronic lymphocytic leukemia.
Marie Takvam, 81, Norwegian author and actor. 
Ginty Vrede, 22, Dutch Muay Thai martial artist, heart attack.

29
Kastuś Akuła, 82, Belarusian writer.
Robert M. Ball, 93, American Commissioner of Social Security (1962–1973).
Margaret Truman, 83, American author, daughter of President Harry S. Truman.
Rubens Gerchman, 66, Brazilian painter, lung cancer.
James Heathman, 90, American who found the 1931 TWA plane crash that killed Knute Rockne, pneumonia.
Raymond Jacobs, 82, American soldier, claimed to be in photo of first flag raised on Iwo Jima.
Philippe Khorsand, 59, French actor.
Sebastian Kräuter, 85, Romanian author and Bishop of Timişoara.
Abu Laith al-Libi, 41, Libyan-born Afghan al-Qaeda leader, missile strike.
Erzsébet Nagy, 80, Hungarian writer, daughter of Prime Minister Imre Nagy.
Manuel Padilla Jr., 52, American actor known for American Graffiti (1973), Scarface (1983) and Tarzan and the Valley of Gold (1966), colon cancer.
Mugabe Were, 39, Kenyan legislator, homicide by gunshot.

30
Wilfrid Marcel Agnès, 87, Canadian diplomat.
Jeremy Beadle, 59, British television presenter (You've Been Framed, Beadle's About), pneumonia.
Claude Faraldo, 71, French actor, screenwriter and film director.
Sean Finnegan, 43, American hardcore punk drummer (Void), apparent heart attack.
Daniel Gráč, 64, Czech Olympic cyclist.
Herbert Kenwith, 90, American television director, complications of prostate cancer.
*Kim Chang-ik, 50, South Korean drummer (Sanulrim), road accident.
Miles Kington, 66, British newspaper columnist and humorist.
Marcial Maciel, 87, Mexican religious leader, founder of the Legionaries of Christ.
Roland Selmeczi, 38, Hungarian actor, car accident.
Wilber Varela, 50, Colombian drug trafficker, shot.

31
Arif Ali, 46, Pakistani-born British regional director for the Associated Press, cancer.
Sanan Alizade, 64, Azerbaijani politician, heart attack.
Veronika Bayer, 67, German actress. 
František Čapek, 93, Czech canoeist, Olympic C1 10,000m gold medallist in 1948, heart ailment.
Joe Clark, 87,  English footballer.
Sir Ivar Colquhoun, 8th Baronet, 92, British aristocrat.
Michael A. Dions, 90, American Olympic swimmer, natural causes.
Tommy N. Evans, 85, American actor (Beethoven: Puppy Time), physician and educator.
Sir Donald Hawley, 86, British diplomat, High Commissioner to Malaysia (1977–1981).
Jim Lacey, 73, Australian administrator of Lord Howe Island, general manager of Western Plains Zoo.
Zeltim Odie Peterson, 10, American purebred pedigreed pug, heart attack.
Mark Schwed, 52, American television critic and journalist.
Bertie Smalls, 72, British criminal turned informant.
David Kimutai Too, 39, Kenyan legislator, shot.
Volodia Teitelboim, 91, Chilean politician.

References

2008-01
 01